Pakistan Medical Research Council (PMRC), formerly known as the Pakistan Health Research Council (PHRC) is an autonomous research agency of Government of Pakistan under the Ministry of National Health Services, Regulation and Coordination in the field of medical and health sciences . It was established in 1962.

Management of the Council
The Council is administered by a Board of Governors whose members include:-

 President of the Council;
 Surgeon General of the Pakistan Army;
 Executive Director of the National Institute of Health;
 the Secretaries of the Health Departments of the respective Provinces and Territories;
 Chairperson of the Pakistan Science Foundation; and
 Executive Director of the Council

The current Executive Director of the Council is Dr. Syed Atta ur Rehman

References

External links
 PMRC official website

Pakistan federal departments and agencies
Medical and health organisations based in Pakistan
Medical research institutes in Pakistan
1962 establishments in Pakistan
Government agencies established in 1962